St. Theresa's Cathedral of Changchun (in ) is a Roman Catholic cathedral in Changchun, Jilin Province, China. It is also called Changchun City Catholic Church or St. Theresa's Diocesan Cathedral in Changchun because the bishop of Jilin Diocese moved here in 1994, from Sacred Heart of Jesus Cathedral of Jilin City.

A Brief history
Its brief history is as follows:
 1895: A French father arrived in the Changchun area, spreading the Good news
 1898: A church was built at the present site
 1912: A school was built next to the church, which is now Changchun City's No. 104 Middle School
 1930: The construction of a cathedral was started and completed two years later
 Since 1959: as the Dioceses in China were made to match the political Provinces, there have been seven bishops in Jilin Diocese, of whom three were French and the rest were Chinese.
 1969-1979: During the Cultural Revolution, all religious activities stopped.  The cathedral was used as a storage of books, and a fire in 1979 destroyed the cathedral building, except the front side (entrance)
 1994: The bishop of Jilin Diocese moved here, from Sacred Heart of Jesus Cathedral in Jilin City.
 2008: The re-building of the cathedral was completed.  Rededication ceremonies held in December.

See also
 Christianity and Catholicism
 Christianity in China
 Roman Catholicism in China
 Chinese Patriotic Catholic Association
 List of Catholic cathedrals in China
 Catholic churches in Northeast China:
Dalian Catholic Church, Sacred Heart of Jesus Cathedral of Shenyang, St. Theresa's Cathedral of Changchun, Sacred Heart of Jesus Cathedral of Harbin, etc.
 Protestant churches in Northeast China:
Yuguang Street Church, Dongguan Church, Changchun Christian Church, Harbin Nangang Christian Church, etc

References

External links
 The Re-dedication of St. Theresa's Cathedral of Changchun (12/02/2008) (in Chinese)

Roman Catholic churches completed in 2008
Roman Catholic cathedrals in China
Churches in Changchun
2008 establishments in China
21st-century Roman Catholic church buildings in China